Luxembourg has an extensive welfare system. It comprises a social security, health, and pension funds. The labour market is highly regulated, and Luxembourg is a corporatist welfare state.  Enrollment is mandatory in one of the welfare schemes for any employed person. Luxembourg's social security system is the Centre Commun de la Securite Sociale (CCSS). Both employees and employers make contributions to the fund at a rate of 25% of total salary, which cannot eclipse more than five times the minimum wage. Social spending accounts for 21.8% of GDP.

Statistics
Luxembourg scores highly in the Human Development Index, a measure that takes into account educational attainment, life expectancy, and per capita income. The country has a relatively low GINI coefficient, a measure of income inequality. The country's per capita income is $99,000 as of 2015, one of the highest in the world. It offers one of the highest replacement rates in the OECD owing in part to immigration. This has ensured a steady stream of contributors into the system. There are some strains on the system, such as high youth unemployment with 26.1% of males, and 18.1% of females between the ages of 15–24 not participating in the labor force. Luxembourg has a low birth rate with a fertility rate of 1.61 children born per woman. The number of contributors has steadily increased relative to the number of pensioners which is helping to ensure the system's long-term solvency. As of 2006, approximately 40% of the country's population are foreigners. Only one-third of the country's labor force are Luxembourgers, with the rest being foreigners residing in Luxembourg and those commuting from the neighboring countries of Germany, Belgium, and France. The second half of 2015 until present has seen an increase in the number of migrants seeking asylum. Compared to past years, the recent migrants tend to be less educated where as in previous years  migrants on average have had higher levels of educational attainment than the general public. The labor-market participation rate of Women is low but increasing. With real GDP growth at 4.8% in 2015 and projected in 2016 to be above 3% Luxembourg is seeing growth substantially higher than the average in the OECD. There are concerns in the labor market, however, chiefly because the unemployment rate has increased from 2% to 7% between 2000–2014.

Welfare programs
The social welfare system comprises many benefits, namely maternity, illness, work-related accidents, pension, disability, basic minimum income, child and family benefits, survivors' insurance, early retirement, and long-term care insurance. The broad entitlement programs of Luxembourg's citizens are managed by the state. The pension scheme has multiple types of users: children (orphans), the disabled, surviving partners, and insured elderly. Since 2009, the National Insurance Fund has taken over activities of four pension funds from the general social welfare system scheme: the Old-age and Invalidity Retirement Fund, Retirement Fund for Skilled Workers, Retirement for Private Employees, and the Agricultural Retirement Fund. The childcare benefits give monthly payments to families depending on the number of children they have, and birth allowances allow three payments to women who have met the compulsory medical visits.

References

Economy of Luxembourg
Social policy
Public policy by country